The black giant squirrel or Malayan giant squirrel (Ratufa bicolor) is a large tree squirrel in the genus Ratufa native to the Indomalayan zootope. It is found in forests from northern Bangladesh, northeast India, eastern Nepal, Bhutan, southern China, Myanmar, Laos, Thailand, Malaysia, Cambodia, Vietnam, and western Indonesia (Java, Sumatra, Bali and nearby small islands).

Description

The black giant squirrel is one of the largest species of squirrel in the world. The subspecies R. b. condorensis of Vietnam's Côn Sơn Island averages only   in head–and–body length and the tail , but otherwise it resembles the typical subspecies.

This species is typically distinctly bicoloured with dark upperparts and pale underparts. The back, top of the head, ears and bushy tail are deep brown to black and the underparts are light buff-coloured. In Sumatra, Java and Bali the hairs of the back and tail are light-tipped, making these sections appear relatively pale (however, the back is still distinctly darker than the underparts). On small islands off Myanmar and in the Strait of Malacca the black giant squirrel has reddish-yellowish underparts.

Habitat
Ratufa bicolor's range includes a variety of bioregions that all share the commonality of being forested. It ranges in elevation from sea level up to at least , in some of the most rugged land in the world. However, in recent decades, R. bicolor's habitat has been steadily encroached upon by human settlement, timber harvesting and agriculture, which along with overhunting by human predation in parts of its range, has resulted in a total loss of up to 30% of the population in the past ten years. However, in some places this species is protected from hunting by law or tradition.

In South Asia R. bicolor dwells among tropical and subtropical coniferous and broadleaf forests.

In Southeast Asia R. bicolor lives in tropical broadleaf evergreen and semi-evergreen forests, but is rarely seen in coniferous forests.

In the tropical rainforest of the Malay Peninsula and Indonesia, R. bicolor is not as abundant as elsewhere in its range, which is probably due to competition from other arboreal species (especially primates) for food in the upper forest canopy.

Among the better places to sight the black giant squirrel is the Kaziranga National Park in the state of Assam, India. Several populations are present in the lower range of the Neora Valley National Park, Kalimpong, India.

A recent study from India showed precipitation during the wettest month of a year is one of the major contributing factor for habitat preference of R. bicolor, along with land use, and vegetation. The species also may be found way beyond 1400 meters in several places. More than 20% of the presence records of the species has been observed above 1500 meters and up to 2700 meters in India. It has been predicted through study that by the year 2050, this species may loose more than 97% of its present suitable habitat due to climate change in India.

Behavior
R. bicolor is diurnal and arboreal, but sometimes climbs down from the forest canopy to feed on the ground. The black giant squirrel rarely enters plantations or settlements, preferring the wild forest.

Its diet consists of seeds, pine cones, fruits, and leaves. It is primarily solitary, and has a litter of from 1 to 2 young, which it raises in a drey (or nest), often located within a hollow space of a tree.

Taxonomy
Further study is required to determine whether Ratufa bicolor actually represents several similar species.

The table below lists the ten recognized subspecies of Ratufa bicolor, along with any synonyms associated with each subspecies:

Gallery

References

Bibliography
Francis, Charles M., Priscilla Barrett. A field guide to the mammals of South-East Asia. London: New Holland, 2008. , OCLC: 190967851.
Lekhakun, Bunsong, Jeffrey A. McNeely. Mammals of Thailand. Bangkok: Association for the Conservation of Wildlife, 1977. OCLC: 3953763.
Nowak, Ronald M. Walker’s mammals of the world. Baltimore: Johns Hopkins University Press, 1999. , OCLC: 39045218. Chapter: "Sciuridae: squirrels, chipmunks, marmots, and prairie dogs" in volume two.

External links
Black Giant Squirrel - Ecology Asia page about this species, with beautiful photos and description.

Ratufa
Rodents of India
Rodents of Bangladesh
Mammals of Nepal
Mammals of Bhutan
Rodents of China
Rodents of Myanmar
Rodents of Laos
Rodents of Thailand
Rodents of Cambodia
Rodents of Vietnam
Rodents of Indonesia
Rodents of Malaysia
Mammals described in 1778
Articles containing video clips
Taxonomy articles created by Polbot
Taxa named by Anders Sparrman